Alder Carr is a 6.7-hectare biological Site of Special Scientific Interest in Hildersham in Cambridgeshire.

The site is a wet valley which has alder on fen peat, a type of woodland, known as carr, which is now rare in East Anglia. Ground flora include angelica and meadowsweet. This habitat is very valuable to invertebrates.

The site is private land with no public access.

References

Sites of Special Scientific Interest in Cambridgeshire
South Cambridgeshire District
Alder carrs